Charlene Thomas-Swinson (born December 11, 1965) is an assistant coach for Las Vegas Aces.

Career
From 2005 to 2011, Thomas-Swinson was the head women's basketball coach at Tulsa. Her overall record as a head coach was 61–86 over five seasons. The 2006 team earned the Conference USA championship, and an NCAA tournament appearance, where they upset fifth seeded NC State in the first round. That year, Thomas-Swinson earned conference coach of the year honors.

Thomas-Swinson previously served as an assistant coach at Indiana, Auburn, and Florida. From 1999 to 2002, she served as an assistant coach in the WNBA, for the Orlando Miracle. From 1996 to 1999, she was the head coach at St. John's.

Thomas-Swinson was a college basketball player at Auburn. The Tigers posted a 99–24 mark, with her as a player. She led the team to its first regular season SEC title in 1987. Auburn won the tournament title, and advanced to the elite eight during her junior season.

Thomas-Swinson was born in Takoma Park, Maryland. In 2021, she was inducted into the Montgomery County, Maryland Sports Hall of Fame.

Auburn statistics
Source

References

1965 births
Auburn Tigers women's basketball coaches
Auburn Tigers women's basketball players
Florida Gators women's basketball coaches
St. John's Red Storm women's basketball coaches
Tulsa Golden Hurricane women's basketball coaches
Las Vegas Aces coaches
Living people
American women's basketball players
American women's basketball coaches
Place of birth missing (living people)